The 2004 Gael Linn Cup, the most important representative competition for elite level participants in the women's team field sport of camogie, was won by Munster, who defeated Connacht in the final, played at Silver Park Kilmacud.

Arrangements
Connacht defeated Leinster in an exceptional quality semi-final by 3–11 to 3–10. Munster defeated Ulster 1–20 to 1–9. A goal from Tipperary's Deirdre Hughes helped Munster defeat Connacht by seven points in the final.
Hughes scored the goal after she was fed by her county colleague Eimear McDonnell, helping Munster lead by 1–8 to 0–5 at half time. Cork' Mary O'Connor was selected as the player of the tournament helped by her tally of 0–3 in the final, while Tipperary's Deirdre Hughes, Eimear McDonnell and Limerick's Eileen O'Brien were Munster's heroines as they defeated Connacht by 1–16 to 1–9.

Final stages

|}

Junior Final

|}
 
|}

References

External links
 Camogie Association

2004 in camogie
2004